Marie Vinck is a Belgian actress.

Life 
Vinck started acting in 1993 at the age of 10 in the Flemish TV series Mother, Why Do We Live?, in which Vinck's mother performed a leading role. In 1998, she acted out again with her mother in the Dutch-Flemish movie Dandelion Game.

Vinck has also given the Flemish dubbing voice to Emma Watson's role as Hermione Granger in the Harry Potter films, along with her colleagues Stef Aerts who gave the Flemish voice to Daniel Radcliffe's role as Harry Potter and Wouter Hendrickx who gave the Flemish voice to Rupert Grint's role as Ron Weasley.

Vinck currently lives in Antwerp.

Filmography

Film 
Dandelion Game – Moniek (1998)
Cheese – Ida Laarmans (1999)Saint Amour – Unknown role (2001, TV Movie)The Kiss – Sarah Lenaerts (2004)Loft – Sarah Delporte (2008)The Box Collector – Juile (2008)SM-rechter – Iris Allegaerts (2009)Amsterdam – Hannah (2009)Oxygen – Anneleen (2010)Lovesick – Michelle (2010)

 TV series Mother, why do we live? (1993)The Kavijaks – Esther 'Belinda' Goldberg (2007)Zone Stad – Els Liekens (2008), Stephanie Arco (2012)The Taste of the Keyser – Louise Lecron (2008)The Rodenburgs – Marie-Claire Rodenburg (2009–2011)13 Commandments – Vicky Degraeve (2018)

 Dubbing roles 

 Live-action films 
Harry Potter films – Hermione Granger (Emma Watson)

 Animated films Toy Story – Hannah Phillips'' (replacing Sarah Freeman's voice)

References

External links 

Living people
Flemish film actresses
Flemish television actresses
Flemish voice actresses
20th-century Flemish actresses
21st-century Flemish actresses
Year of birth missing (living people)